The Federation of International Bandy (FIB; ,) is the international governing body for the sport of bandy, including the variant called rink bandy. The federation is headquartered in Söderhamn, Sweden.

History
Bandy as we know it today has been played since the later half of the 19th Century. Rules were set up in the 1890s by the National Bandy Association in England and by the corresponding body in Russia. The Ligue International de Hockey sur Glace (LIHG) was founded on 15 May 1908 at 34 Rue de Provence in Paris, France, at a time when bandy and ice hockey were seen as variants of the same game. The founders of the federation were representatives from Belgium, France, Great Britain, Switzerland and Bohemia (now Czech republic). However, as ice hockey became an Olympic sport while bandy did not, bandy only survived in some of the Nordic countries and the Soviet Union. LIHG is now the International Ice Hockey Federation.

In the 1940s, the Nordic countries Finland, Norway and Sweden set up a joint rules committee. In the early 1950s, the Soviet Union decided to break out of its isolation in international sport and started a friendly exchange with said Nordic countries.

The federation was formed on 12 February 1955 at Hotell Malmen in Stockholm, Sweden, by representatives from Finland, Norway, the Soviet Union and Sweden. The federation has had its base in Sweden since 1979. The present office is situated in Söderhamn, headed by FIB Secretary General Bo Nyman. Stein Pedersen is the current President of the FIB.

When FIB was formed in 1955, it introduced the same rules for bandy all over the world. Especially in Russia and other Soviet Republics, different rules had been used prior to this. Bandy World Championships have been organized for men since 1957 and for women since 2004.

The federation was named the International Bandy Federation (IBF) between 1957 and 2001. The current name was adopted at a request from the International Olympic Committee when the IOC made bandy a "recognized sport", since the acronym IBF at the time was already in use by the International Badminton Federation (in 2006, the International Badminton Federation changed names to Badminton World Federation and now uses the acronym BWF). In 2004, FIB was accepted by IOC.

FIB is a member of Association of IOC Recognised International Sports Federations as well as Global Association of International Sports Federations.

The number of bandy playing nations have grown considerably in the last decades. There were 27 national members of the federation as of 2017
 and Slovakia applied for membership.

After the International Olympic Committee’s recommendations following the 2022 Russian invasion of Ukraine, the Federation of International Bandy excluded Russia from participating in the 2022 Women's Bandy World Championship. The men's 2020 Bandy World Championship had already been postponed due to the COVID-19 pandemic and was to be held in 2022, but was finally cancelled on 1 March 2022, after Finland, Sweden, Norway, and the United States announced that they would not take part in the competition in Russia due to the Russian invasion of Ukraine.

Purposes
In 2011, FIB formulated its purposes as being the following.

FIB vows to completely share the principles and articles of the Olympic Charter in its activities, including the policy with regard to anti-doping controls.

FIB wants to promote the development of the sports of bandy and rink bandy in the member countries and wants to carry on propaganda for the importance and advantages of these sports. FIB also works for bandy to become an Olympic sport.

FIB declares itself to be an "independent autonomic mainsports organization which mainly is governing bandy activities all over the world".

FIB leads and supervises bandy and rink bandy around the world. FIB also sees as its job to settle the rules for the games.

One national member association should be entrusted by FIB with arranging an official world championship. FIB means that at least four nations must participate for it to be worth an event.

FIB also wants to promote the introduction and the membership of new nations to the organisation.

Rules of the game
The rules of bandy is set in the Bandy Playing Rules. It is overseen by the Rules and Referee Committee.

Cooperation with other sport governing bodies
FIB has an agreement with the International Skating Union to use the same arenas. The cooperation between the two federations is increasing, since both have an interest in more indoor venues with large ice surfaces being built.

Presidents
The following persons have been presidents of FIB:

Events
 Bandy World Championship
 Women's Bandy World Championship
 Youth Bandy World Championship (one class for girls and four classes for boys and young men)
 Bandy World Cup
 Bandy World Cup Women
 Bandy World Cup Girls Y17
 European Bandy Championships
 Bandy at the Asian Winter Games

Members and years of admission
The federation was founded by the national bandy associations in Finland, Norway, the Soviet Union and Sweden on 12 February 1955.

The Soviet membership was taken over by Russia in early 1992, following the dissolution of the Soviet Union in December 1991. For two months, the former Soviet Union national bandy team appeared as Commonwealth of Independent States, but the CIS was never formally a member of the FIB.

Regions of Members:

27 Countries in 4 Zones (Updated at 25 March 2022):

Former members
 Soviet Union 1955–1991: When the international federation was founded in 1955, the Soviet Union was one of its founding members. The Soviet national federation was called the Federation of bandy and field hockey USSR (Федерация хоккея с мячом и хоккея на траве СССР). The Soviet Union had a national bandy team for men and a national bandy team for women. When the Soviet Union was dissolved in December 1991, the national team came to represent the Commonwealth of Independent States for some months. In 1992, Russia took over its place in FIB.

 West Germany/Germany 1990–1991: Before the present German Bandy Association was founded in 2013, there had been an earlier, short-lived German federation, which was a member of FIB from 29 January 1990 until March 1991, when it voluntarily choose to leave. In its short life span, it still overlived the German reunification in October 1990.

A number of national federations have been admitted as members during the years but then for different reasons not survived, often because of a lack of interest in the sport in their countries. In early 2017, seven federations were removed from the member list of FIB and in the summer of 2018 one more. These defunct national federations were:

 , Bandy Federation of Argentina, admitted to FIB in 2008
 , Australian Bandy League, admitted to FIB on 4 June 2006
 , Bandy Federation of Denmark, admitted to FIB in 2014
 , Bandy Federation of Ireland, admitted to FIB on 4 June 2006
 , Italian Bandy Federation, admitted to FIB on 26 October 2003
 , Bandy Federation of Kyrgyzstan, admitted to FIB on 3 February 2005
 , Bandy Federation of Poland, admitted to FIB on 31 January 2006
 , Bandy Federation of Serbia, admitted to FIB on 4 June 2006

Continental federations
Some of the Asian countries in FIB, and also the former member Kyrgyzstan, have founded the Asian Bandy Association, which has its headquarters in Astana (most recently known as Nur-Sultan), Kazakhstan. This helps organize the bandy competition at the Asian Winter Games and works to spread the knowledge of bandy in Asia.

Members:

See also
Association of IOC Recognised International Sports Federations

Notes

External links
Official website

 
Sports organizations established in 1955
Bandy
 
Sports governing bodies in Sweden
Bandy
Sports governing bodies
1955 establishments in Sweden